Leptoconops albiventris, the white nono, nono blanc des plages or nono purutia, is a midge species in the genus Leptoconops found in French Polynesia. It was accidentally introduced in the Marquesas archipelago in 1914.

References

External links
 Les nono on www.ilm.pf (French)

albiventris
Insects described in 1915
Fauna of French Polynesia